Agri Bujaq or Agari Bujaq or Egri Bujaq may refer to::
 Agari Bujaq, Gilan
 Agri Bujaq, West Azerbaijan